Claudio Gerardo Torres Gaete (born 30 March 2003) is a Chilean professional footballer who plays as a right winger for Chilean Primera División side Huachipato.

Club career
A product of Huachipato youth system, Torres can play as a winger both in attack and in midfield. He made his professional debut in the 2021 Copa Chile match versus San Antonio Unido on June 23, 2021, and scored by first time in the match versus Deportes Temuco of the same tournament on July 5.

International career
Torres took part of the Chile U15 squad at the UEFA U-16 Development Tournament in Finland in April 2019. Since 2021, he has been frequently called up to training microcycles of Chile at under-20 level.

References

External links
 
 Claudio Torres at playmakerstats.com (English version of ceroacero.es)

2003 births
Living people
People from Talcahuano
Chilean footballers
Chile youth international footballers
Association football forwards
C.D. Huachipato footballers
Chilean Primera División players